Lordivino Ignacio (born December 11, 1977), known professionally as Bassilyo, is a Filipino rapper and songwriter. The name Bassilyo is based on the character Basilio, from the novel Noli Me Tangere. Bassilyo is also an occasional actor.

Career
Bassilyo was part of the group Crazy as Pinoy, which appeared on Eat Bulaga!'''s Rappublic of the Philippines'' contest in 2002. Bassilyo credited FlipTop Battle League for his comeback that he had gone viral again through three rap battles. Bassilyo became best known for the single "Lord, Patawad" (lit. "Lord, Forgive Me") in 2014, whose lyrics were derived from his early life and observations of his surroundings; Bassilyo later admitted in an interview that he spent time in prison for undisclosed reasons, as well as having been addicted to gambling, both of which served as inspiration for the song.

Discography

Studio albums

Singles

Appearances

Music videos
 "Ilusyon" (Abra feat. Arci Muñoz, 2013)
 "Nakakamiss" (Smugglaz, Curse One, Dello, 2014)

Television

Accolades

References

Further reading
 
 
 
 .

External links
 
 

1977 births
Filipino rappers
Living people
People from Marikina
Musicians from Metro Manila
MCA Music Inc. (Philippines) artists